Crisscross is the eighth volume in a series of Repairman Jack books written by American author F. Paul Wilson. The book was first published by Gauntlet Press in a signed limited first edition (May 2004) then later as a trade hardcover from Forge (October 2004) and a mass market paperback from Forge (June 2006).

2004 American novels
Repairman Jack (series)